The Villa of the Quintilii (Italian: Villa dei Quintili) is an ancient Roman villa beyond the fifth milestone along the Via Appia Antica just outside the traditional boundaries of Rome, Italy. It was built by the rich and cultured brothers Sextus Quintilius Valerius Maximus and Sextus Quintilius Condianus (consuls in 151 AD).

The ruins of this villa suburbana are of such an extent that when they were first excavated, the site was called Roma Vecchia ("Old Rome") by the locals, as they occupied too great a ground, it seemed, to have been anything less than a town. The nucleus of the villa was constructed in the time of Hadrian. The villa included extensive thermae fed by its own aqueduct, and, what was even more unusual, a hippodrome, which dates to the fourth century, when the villa was Imperial property: the emperor Commodus coveted the villa strongly enough to put to death its owners in 182 and confiscate it for himself.

In 1776 Gavin Hamilton, the entrepreneurial painter and purveyor of Roman antiquities, excavated some parts of the Villa of the Quintilii, still called "Roma Vecchia", and the sculptures he uncovered revealed the imperial nature of the site:

There he found five marble sculptures, including "An Adonis asleep", that he sold to Charles Townley and have come to the British Museum and "A Bacchante with the tyger", listed as sold to Mr Greville. The large marble relief of Asclepius found at the site passed from Hamilton to the Earl of Shelburne, later Marquess of Lansdowne, at Lansdowne House, London. The "Braschi Venus" from the site was purchased by Pius VI's nephew, Luigi Braschi Onesti.

Today the archeological site houses a museum with marble friezes and sculptures that once adorned the villa. The nympheum, the hall of the tepidarium and the baths may also be visited. A grand terrace overlooking the Via Appia Nuova, which dates back to 1784, commands a fine view of the Castelli Romani district. The villa's grounds extended even beyond the route of the Via Appia Nuova.

See also

Villa of the sette bassi

Notes

External links

Ancient Roman buildings and structures in Rome
Quintili
Museums in Rome
National museums of Italy
Commodus
Houses completed in the 2nd century